Hal Koerner (born January 23, 1976, in Morgantown, WV) is an American distance runner specializing in ultramarathon running. He is the owner of a specialty running store, Rogue Valley Runners, located in the mountainous Southern Oregon town of Ashland. He is one of the subjects of JB Benna's feature-length documentary "Unbreakable: The Western States 100".

He is Race Director of the Pine to Palm 100 Mile Endurance Run - A hundred-mile footrace from Williams, OR to Ashland, OR held each year the second weekend in September. In addition to that race he also directs the Lithia Loop Trail Marathon in Ashland, OR.

In 2014, "Hal Koerner's Field Guide to Ultrarunning" was published and released by VeloPress. The book details training for an ultra marathon; from 50k to 100 miles. It debuted #1 in its category on Amazons bestsellers list.

Hal has held the Fastest Know Time for the Colorado Trail (489 miles) and the John Muir Trail (221 miles). To date he has completed over 150 ultra marathons.

Notable wins
Javelina Jundred, 2013
Hardrock Hundred Mile Endurance Run, 2012
Rocky Raccoon 100, 2012
Javelina Jundred, 2011 
Canadian Death Race, 2010 
Western States Endurance Run, 2009
Angeles Crest 100, 2008
Western States Endurance Run, 2007
Angeles Crest 100, 2006
The Bear 100, 1999-2003
Kettle Morraine 100, 2001

External links
 Rogue Valley Runners

References

American male ultramarathon runners
Living people
1976 births